Bernie Leighton (January 30, 1921 – September 16, 1994) was an American jazz pianist.

Leighton was born in West Haven, Connecticut. He first played professionally at the end of the 1930s. He played with Bud Freeman, Leo Reisman, Raymond Scott (1940) and Benny Goodman (1940-41) before serving in the Army. Following his discharge, he worked as a studio sideman, with Dave Tough (1946), Billie Holiday (1949), Neal Hefti (1951), Goodman again, Artie Shaw (1953), John Serry, Sr. (1956), James Moody (1963) and Bob Wilber (1969). He did a tour with Tony Bennett in 1972-73.

While Leighton was best known as a sideman, he also recorded extensively as a leader; he recorded for Keynote Records in 1946, Mercury Records in 1950, an LP on Columbia Records in 1950, Brunswick in 1951, LPs for Disneyland and Capitol in 1957, and a tribute to Duke Ellington released in 1974.

His instrumental cover of Connie Francis' "Don't Break The Heart That Loves You" on the Colpix label in 1962 reached #101 on Billboard's listing.

Leighton has a cameo role in the film Hannah and Her Sisters (1986). He died in Coconut Creek, Florida.

Discography
{{external media |align=center |width=280px |audio1= You may hear Bernie Leighton performing with John Serry on the album Squeeze Play in 1956 [https://archive.org/details/lp_squeeze-play-featuring-the-dynamic-accordi_john-serry Here on archive.org] }}With James MoodyGreat Day (Argo, 1963)With Gerry MulliganHolliday with Mulligan (DRG, 1961 [1980]) with Judy HollidayWith Mark MurphyThat's How I Love the Blues! (Riverside, 1962)With Charlie ParkerBig Band (Clef, 1954)With John Serry Sr.Squeeze Play (album) (Dot Records, 1956) with Al CaiolaWith Jack Teagarden'Think Well of Me (Verve, 1962)
With Cal TjaderWarm Wave'' (Verve, 1964)
 With Jackie Gleason Orchestra on multiple Capitol recordings from 1956 through 1966

References

Scott Yanow, [ Bernie Leighton] at Allmusic

1921 births
1994 deaths
American jazz pianists
American male pianists
American session musicians
20th-century American pianists
Jazz musicians from Connecticut
20th-century American male musicians
American male jazz musicians